The 1953–54 Allsvenskan was the 20th season of the top division of Swedish handball. 10 teams competed in the league. Redbergslids IK won the league and claimed their fourth Swedish title. IFK Borås and Västra Frölunda IF were relegated.

League table

References 

Swedish handball competitions